Caleb Whitefoord  (1734 – 25 January 1810) was a Scottish merchant, diplomat, and political satirist.

Life

He was born in Edinburgh in 1734, probably in the family home of Whitefoord House on the Canongate, the illegitimate son of Colonel Charles (James) Whitefoord of the Royal Marines (son of Sir Adam Whitefoord, 1st Baronet), he was educated at James Mundell's School and Edinburgh University.

He moved to London, and in 1756 became a wine merchant.

In 1782, he served as Lord Shelburne's envoy to Benjamin Franklin on the Peace Commission at Paris. On 30 November 1782, during a meeting with Franklin and a French delegate, Whitefoord recorded that the Frenchman "talked of the growing greatness of America; & that the thirteen United States would form the greatest Empire in the World. — Yes sir, I replied & they will all speak English, every one of 'em. His Triumph was check'd, he understood what was intended to be convey'd, viz. that from a similarity of Language Manners and Religion that great Empire would be English not French".

In 1784, he was elected a Fellow of the Royal Society of London, and in 1788, upon the proposal of Robert Arbuthnot, Sir William Forbes and Alexander Fraser Tytler he was elected a Fellow of the Royal Society of Edinburgh. In 1790, Whitefoord was elected to the American Philosophical Society. In 1800, he married a Miss Craven, and had issue, amongst whom an eldest son, Rev. Caleb Whitefoord, M.A. (Oxon.), rector of Burford with Whitton, Herefordshire, had five sons. He died at 28 Argyll Street, London, on 25 January 1810, and was interred at St Mary on Paddington Green Churchyard.

Works

 In 1766, Whitefoord published whimsical misreadings of newspaper texts, using the pseudonym Papyrius Cursor (a play on the name of Lucius Papirius Cursor).

Co-authored
 
  – Charles Whitefoord served in Wynyard's (4th Marines), Gooch's, and the 5th Marines in the 1740s.

References

1734 births
1810 deaths
18th-century Scottish people
Fellows of the Royal Society
Fellows of the Royal Society of Edinburgh
Scottish merchants
Diplomats from Edinburgh
Scottish political writers
Scottish satirists
Writers from Edinburgh
People educated at James Mundell's School
Alumni of the University of Edinburgh
British political satire
British diplomats